The Manly-Warringah Australian Football Club are an Australian rules football club that play in the Sydney AFL Premier League and is the only senior club located on Sydney’s northern beaches. The club colours are maroon and white. The Wolves' have men's teams in Premier Division, Premier Division Reserves, Division 2 and a Division 1 under 19's team. In the Women's competition, the Wolves field a Division 1 and a Division 3 side in 2019. 

Manly Warringah's home ground is Weldon Oval located in the northern Sydney suburb of Harbord.

History 
The Manly-Warringah Wolves were formed in 1969. Founding members Harry Marston, George Klause and Bruce Hutton discovered enough interest on the northern beaches for an Australian Rules team to be formed. The club started in the SFL Under-20 competition.

The following year Manly-Warringah joined the newly formed Sydney District Association. The formation of this competition was the culmination of several clubs’ efforts, none more so than Manly, and in particular Harry Marston.

The Wolves have been a dominant performer in the Sydney AFL First Division competition. Manly-Warringah has now won Sydney AFL First Grade premierships in 1990, 1995, 1996 and in recent years has reached the finals in the past 8 successive seasons including premierships in 2007, 2011 and 2012. The Wolves were promoted to Premier Division in 2013 after an undefeated 2012 season in Division 1 and a percentage of over five hundred. They also had an astonishing average winning margin of over one hundred points per game.

After Division One premierships in 2011 and 2012, the 2013 season saw the Manly Warringah Wolves promoted to the Sydney AFL Premier Division for the first time in their history. The Wolves won their first game in the Sydney AFL Premier Division 159 - 42 against 2012 grand finalist, Balmain Dockers. The wolves had a dream start in the premier division winning 9 straight games to start the season. The wolves finished 2013 with the minor premiership. The wolves had the first week off in the semi finals before beating St George Dragons 85 - 67 to qualify for the grand final and earn a week off. The wolves faced Pennant Hills in the grand final and ran out winners 80 - 72. They are the first team in Sydney AFL history to win the grand final after being promoted to the Premier Division.

Season 2014 saw the dawn of a new era, in which the Wolves formed an Alliance with the GWS GIANTS, in turn changing the name from the Manly Wolves to the Manly Giants. It was a significant development for football on the northern beaches. On the field the success in the Premier division continued with the wolves having a dominant season winning a second premiership having only losing one game for the season. This year also marked the establishment of Manly-Warringah's first ever female team. Alisa Kelley, rallied up enough interest to form the first ever senior women's AFL team on the Northern Beaches. The team was entered into the Division 2 AFL Sydney competition and finished 6th in their maiden season. 

Moving into 2016 and the club was renamed back to the original "Manly-Warringah Wolves". 

In 2018, the Wolves were successful in entering in a second women's team into the AFL Sydney Competition. In 2018, the club fielded women's teams in Division 1 and Division 2. After a successful 2018 campaign for Division 1, the team remains in this league in 2019 and are a strong top 4 team. The Division 2 side has been relegated to Division 3 for 2019.  

The club has also won three successive Club Championship's for the best Club in the Sydney Afl, 2012, 2013 , 2014 .

Premierships: 1985, 1990, 1995, 1996, 2007, 2011, 2012, 2013 ,2014. and 2020 (Womens)

External links
 

Australian rules football clubs in Sydney
1969 establishments in Australia
Manly, New South Wales
Australian rules football clubs established in 1969